Bill Farmer (born November 14, 1952) is an American voice actor, comedian and impressionist. He has performed the voice of the Disney character Goofy since 1987, and has also been the voice of Pluto and Horace Horsecollar since 1990.

Early life
Bill Farmer was born on November 14, 1952, in Pratt, Kansas, the second child in his family. His parents were of English and Welsh descent.

Farmer began doing voices, at the age of ten, involved doing impressions, especially those of Western stars like John Wayne or Walter Brennan. He and his friends would sometimes go through fast food drive-thrus and order foods in his character voices. Farmer graduated from the University of Kansas in 1975, where he became a member of the Sigma Chi Fraternity. In university, he found work in radio and TV and then moved on to stand-up comedy as an impressionist. In 1982, while he was still doing stand-up comedy, Farmer worked at a comedy club called the Comedy Corner in Dallas, Texas. He continued to work there until his move to Hollywood in 1986.

His decision to move to California came from a Dallas commercial agent who suggested that, given his talent for voices, he should try his luck in California. He was recently married, but he and his wife talked it over and came to an arrangement. She stayed back in Dallas while he commuted for a year after he got an apartment. Then four months after his moving out to Hollywood, his agent asked him if he could do any Disney characters.

Farmer asserts that voice acting is not about funny voices, but about acting. His mentor was the versatile voice actor Daws Butler, the man behind many of Hanna-Barbera's characters. He taught Farmer that when doing cartoon voices, a person is not merely doing a funny voice, but they are an actor and the acting is premier and that one has to think like the character one is performing.

Career
Upon moving to Hollywood, he got a call for an open audition for the Disney character Goofy. When he auditioned for the role, he studied the way the original actor Pinto Colvig performed as Goofy in the classic cartoons. He studied the hilarious laugh and the distinctive "gawrsh". After auditioning for the role, he inherited the voice of Goofy in January 1987 (and also Pluto in 1990).

He originated the voice of Horace Horsecollar in Disney's version of The Prince and the Pauper and has played him ever since as well. Farmer also performed additional voices on The New Adventures of Mighty Mouse (1987) and Astro Boy (2004).

In 1987, Farmer had a small part as reporter Justin Ballard-Watkins in the film RoboCop.

Other significant characters he has played include Yosemite Sam, Sylvester and Foghorn Leghorn in the film Space Jam (1996). He has also done several guest voices, both on TV, including The Grim Adventures of Billy & Mandy and in video games, including the Destroy All Humans! series, Namco's Tales of Symphonia, where he voiced Governor-General Dorr, in Square Enix's Kingdom Hearts series reprising the role of Goofy, Detective Date in the SEGA game Yakuza, Captain Wedgewood and Frill Lizard in Ty the Tasmanian Tiger, many voices on EverQuest II, Cletus Samson, Floyd Sanders, Jeff Meyers and Ryan LaRosa in the video game Dead Rising and Sam and others in the cult classic adventure game Sam & Max Hit the Road.

Farmer has also played Secret Squirrel on Harvey Birdman, Attorney at Law in both the animated series and its spin-off video game, Stinkie in Casper: A Spirited Beginning and Casper Meets Wendy, Stanley in Beauty and the Beast, male cats in Cats Don't Dance, photographer in Monsters, Inc., Oliver Sansweet's lawyer in The Incredibles, Willie Bear in Horton Hears a Who!, Sam the Bus Driver in The Grinch, Mr. Leghorn in Loonatics Unleashed and Bugs Bunny and Daffy Duck in Robot Chicken.

From 2014 to 2016, he played Doc, the leader of the title characters in Disney's animated television series The 7D. He also voiced Blackhoof Boar Clan Leader in the 2008 video game Kung Fu Panda.

Farmer still regularly performs comedy routines at the Laugh Factory. He has been voicing the character "Hop-Pop" on Disney's Amphibia.

In 2020, Farmer began hosting the live action television show It's a Dog's Life with Bill Farmer on Disney+.

Recognition
In September 2009, Farmer was named a Disney Legend. In 2011, the International Family Film Festival awarded Bill Farmer the 'Friz Award' for Animation.

He won the Annie Award for Voice Acting in an Animated TV/Broadcast Production for his work as Goofy and Grandma Goofy in Mickey Mouse.

Personal life
Farmer has been married to his wife, Jennifer, since 1985. Together they have a son, Austin.

Filmography

Film

Animation

Anime

Video games

Theme park attractions

Live-action

Awards and nominations

References

External links

 
 
Bill Farmer on Breaking it Down with Frank MacKay

1952 births
Living people
20th-century American male actors
21st-century American male actors
American male comedians
American male video game actors
American male voice actors
American people of English descent
American people of Welsh descent
American impressionists (entertainers)
Disney people
Annie Award winners
Comedians from Kansas
Male actors from Kansas
People from Pratt, Kansas
University of Kansas alumni